Argonne is an extinct town located in Miner County, in the U.S. state of South Dakota.

History
Argonne was originally named St. Marys, South Dakota and under the latter name was laid out in 1886. A post office called Argonne was established in 1920, and remained in operation until 1954. The present name commemorates the Battle of Meuse-Argonne. In 1953, Delbert Gillam, a player for the Argonne Arrows high school basketball team, set a South Dakota state record for the most points scored in a game by a player. Gillam scored 72 points, completing 31 field goals and 10 free throws. More information on Argonne can be found on the Miner County Historical Society's website.

References

Unincorporated communities in Miner County, South Dakota
Unincorporated communities in South Dakota